Neermaathalathinte Pookkal (English title: Flowers of Neermaathalam) is a Kerala State award winning 2006 Indian Malayalam-language television film directed by Sohanlal based on a story written by Madhavikutty (Kamala Das).

Team
 Direction - Sohanlal
 Producer of the film - Amrita Television Channel 
 Story: Based on famous artist -  Madhavikutty ( Kamala Das ).
 Screenplay: Sohanlal & Sreevraham Balakrishnan 
 Music : Pandit Ramesh Narayan 
 Cinematography : Udayan Ambadi  
 Editor : Sasi Menon 
 Art : Rishi
 Audiography  : C.R.Chandran

References

External links
 Making of Neermaathalathinte Pookkal

2000s Malayalam-language films
2006 romantic drama films
2006 television films
2006 films
Indian romantic drama films